Prosipho glacialis is a species of sea snail, a marine gastropod mollusk in the family Buccinidae, the true whelks.

References

 Engl, W. (2012). Shells of Antarctica. Hackenheim: Conchbooks. 402 pp.

External links

Buccinidae
Gastropods described in 1912